Garforth and Swillington is an electoral ward of Leeds City Council in east Leeds, West Yorkshire, covering the town of Garforth as well as the villages of Great Preston and Swillington.

Boundaries 
The Garforth and Swillington ward includes the civil parishes of:
Austhorpe (east half)
Great and Little Preston
Sturton Grange
Swillington

Councillors 

 indicates seat up for re-election.
 indicates councillor defection.
* indicates incumbent councillor.

Elections since 2010

May 2022

May 2021

May 2019

May 2018

May 2016

May 2015

May 2014

May 2012

May 2011

May 2010

Notes

References

Wards of Leeds